Snapping: America's Epidemic of Sudden Personality Change is a 1978 book written by Flo Conway and Jim Siegelman which describes the authors' theory of religious conversion. They propose that "snapping"  is a mental process through which a person is recruited by a cult or new religious movement, or leaves the group through deprogramming or exit counseling. Political ideological conversions are also included, with Patty Hearst given as an example.

Two editions of the book were published, the first (1978) by Lippincott Williams & Wilkins and reprinted in 1979 by Dell Publishing. A second edition (1995) was printed by Stillpoint Press, a publishing company owned by the authors.

Conway and Siegelman wrote an article in Playboy and Science Digest in 1979 and 1982 respectively to advertise and discuss their book and findings.

Concept 
Conway and Siegelman describe snapping as:

Snapping has been said to create the effect of an entirely new person, often completely different and unrecognizable.

Conway and Siegelman further proposed that a disorder which they named "information disease" was caused by alteration of the neurological pathways of the brain by group indoctrination and mind control activities.

Scholarly reception 
The scholarly reception to the book is mixed. 

Michael Rogers, writing for Library Journal, believes that the work is important for public and academic libraries. Reverend Mark L. Middleton, though noting that he does not fully endorse the views of the book, believes its an important contribution to "religious and mental health literature".

Brock K. Kilbourne, a social psychologist with a Ph.D. from the University of Nevada, Reno, criticized the methodology and analysis in the book and accompanying articles. He argues, through analysis of Conway and Siegelman's data, that there was "no support" for their conclusions, and in some cases the data showed the opposite of what they argued (i.e. cult participation might have positive benefits). In a response, Michael D. Langone and Brendan A. Maher argued that Kilbourne's statistical analysis is flawed and that no conclusions can be made, though they concede that Conway and Siegelman have a lack of statistical analysis of their data. In a rejoinder, Kilbourne reasserted his findings. Additionally, Religion scholars James R. Lewis and David G. Bromley argue that there are significant methodological problems in research including anti-cult or anti-religious bias, predominance of deprogrammed individuals in the sample, and the fact that some of the people in the sample were receiving therapy while in the clinical trial.

References

1978 non-fiction books
Books about cults
Books about religion
Works about personality
Books about mind control